The 2010 Maine gubernatorial election took place on November 2, 2010. Incumbent Democratic Governor John Baldacci was term-limited and unable to seek re-election. Primary elections took place on June 8, 2010. The candidates who appeared on the November ballot were (in alphabetical order by last name):  Eliot Cutler (Independent), Paul LePage (Republican), Libby Mitchell (Democrat), Shawn Moody (Independent), and Kevin Scott (Independent).

With 94% of precincts reporting on the day after the election, the Bangor Daily News declared LePage the winner, carrying 38.1% of the votes. Cutler was in second place with 36.7% of the votes (less than 7,500 votes behind LePage), while Mitchell was a distant third with 19%. Moody and Scott had 5% and 1%, respectively. Two days after the election, with 99% of precincts reporting, LePage's lead over Cutler had widened to more than 10,000 votes. This election was the first since 1990 that Republicans won a gubernatorial election in Maine.

Democratic primary

Candidates

On ballot
Patrick K. McGowan, former State Conservation Commissioner
Elizabeth "Libby" Mitchell, President of the Maine Senate and candidate for U. S. Senate in 1984
Steven Rowe, former Maine Attorney General and former state representative
Rosa Scarcelli, business owner

Write-in
Donna Dion, former Mayor of Biddeford. Did not appear on the ballot due to lack of petition signatures, but continued her campaign in the primary as a write-in candidate.

Withdrawn
Dawn Hill, State Representative. Hill withdrew from the race on January 1, 2010, citing the crowded field of candidates.
John G. Richardson, former Commissioner of Economic and Community Development and former Speaker of the House. Richardson withdrew from the race on April 26 amid allegations that some of his campaign workers had not followed proper procedures for collecting donations to qualify him for Maine Clean Election funding. The primary ballots had already been printed before Richardson withdrew from the race, so Richardson's name appeared on the ballot even though he was no longer a candidate.
Peter Truman (also known as Peter Throumoulos), former state representative and convicted forger. Did not appear on the ballot due to lack of petition signatures.

Declined
Brian Bolduc, state representative
Tom Allen, former U.S. Representative

Polling

Results

At 11:32 p.m. EDT, WCSH declared Libby Mitchell the winner of the Democratic primary.

Republican primary

Candidates

On ballot
Steve Abbott, former chief of staff for Senator Susan Collins
William Beardsley, former president of Husson University
Matt Jacobson, president of Maine & Company, a private business attraction organization; former President of the St. Lawrence & Atlantic Railroad
Paul LePage, Mayor of Waterville and general manager of Marden's Surplus & Salvage store chain
Peter Mills, State Senator and candidate for governor in 2006
Les Otten, founder of American Skiing Company and former Boston Red Sox co-owner
Bruce Poliquin, business owner/manager and economist

Declined
 Peter Cianchette, United States Ambassador to Costa Rica and 2002 Republican nominee for governor
 Kevin Raye, State Senate Minority Leader
 Josh Tardy, State House Minority Leader

Polling

Results

At 11:19 p.m. EDT, WCSH declared Paul LePage the winner of the GOP primary.

Independents

Candidates on the ballot
Eliot Cutler, attorney, former staff member for U.S. Senator Edmund Muskie, and former adviser to President Jimmy Carter
Shawn Moody, business owner
Kevin L. Scott, business owner

Write-in candidates

 John Jenkins, former state senator, former mayor of both Auburn and Lewiston, and a 2002 gubernatorial candidate. Jenkins, who won his most recent mayoral campaign by write-in, declared he would run for Governor of Maine if 5,000 people followed his Facebook fan page within 45 days.
Beverly Cooper-Pete. Did not appear on the ballot due to lack of petition signatures, but continued her campaign as a write-in candidate.

Disqualified candidates

Alex Hammer, business owner and self-published author. Did not appear on the ballot due to not meeting the deadline for turning in petition signatures. Hammer attempted to turn in some of the signatures electronically, but the Secretary of State ruled that such methods were not allowed. Hammer filed suit to appear on the ballot in Penobscot County Superior Court on June 28, 2010. On September 28, 2010, the judge upheld the Secretary of State's decision.

Withdrawn

Samme Bailey. Did not appear on the ballot due to lack of petition signatures.
Augustus Edgerton. Did not appear on the ballot due to lack of petition signatures.
Michael Heath, former leader of the Christian Civic League of Maine (now known as the Maine Family Policy Council). Withdrew from the race due to lack of petition signatures.
John Whitcomb. Did not appear on the ballot due to lack of petition signatures.

Maine Green Independent Party
The Maine Green Independent Party did not have a gubernatorial candidate on the ballot, as no candidate collected required number of signatures.

Withdrawn
Lynne Williams, attorney and former state chair of the Maine Green Independent Party. On March 15, 2010, Lynne Williams announced her withdrawal from the campaign, citing a lack of clean elections funds and qualifying signatures.
Patrick Quinlan, political activist, author, and lone legislative aide of Maine Green Independent Party caucus in state House of Representatives for 2004 and 2005; former campaign manager and consultant for Green state representative John Eder

General election

Predictions

Polling

* Shawn Moody and Kevin Scott, two Independent candidates who appeared on the ballot, were not offered as choices in the Rasmussen polls.

Results

See also
Governor of Maine
List of governors of Maine

References

External links
Maine Secretary of State – Elections Division
Maine Governor Candidates at Project Vote Smart
Campaign contributions for 2010 Maine Governor from Follow the Money
Maine Governor 2010 from OurCampaigns.com
2010 Maine Gubernatorial General Election: Paul LePage (R) vs Libby Mitchell (D) graph of multiple polls from Pollster.com
Election 2010: Maine Governor from Rasmussen Reports
2010 Maine Governor – LePage vs. Mitchell vs. Cutler from Real Clear Politics
2010 Maine Governor's Race from CQ Politics
Race Profile in The New York Times

Official campaign websites (Archived)
Patrick McGowan (D)
Elizabeth "Libby" Mitchell (D)
Steven Rowe (D)
Rosa Scarcelli (D)
Steven Abbott (R)
William Beardsley (R)
Matt Jacobson (R)
Paul LePage (R)
Peter Mills (R)
Les Otten (R)
Bruce Poliquin (R)
Eliot Cutler (I)
Alex Hammer (I)
Shawn Moody (I)
Kevin Scott (I)

Debates
 Debate hosted by the Associated General Contractors of America (Democrats, Republicans, and Cutler)
 Democrat debate hosted by WCSH-TV, Part 1
 Democrat debate hosted by WCSH-TV, Part 2
 Republican debate hosted by WCSH-TV, Part 1
 Republican debate hosted by WCSH-TV, Part 2
 Democrat debate hosted by WMTW-TV and University of Southern Maine, Part 1
 Democrat debate hosted by WMTW-TV and University of Southern Maine, Part 2
 Republican debate hosted by WMTW-TV and University of Southern Maine, Part 1
 Republican debate hosted by WMTW-TV and University of Southern Maine, Part 2
 Democrat debate hosted by Maine Public Broadcasting
 Republican debate hosted by Maine Public Broadcasting
 Debate featuring all five general election candidates, hosted by WGME-TV and MaineToday Media, Part 1
 Debate featuring all five general election candidates, hosted by WGME-TV and MaineToday Media, Part 2
 Debate featuring all five general election candidates, hosted by WMTW-TV and University of Southern Maine, Part 1
 Debate featuring all five general election candidates, hosted by WMTW-TV and University of Southern Maine, Part 2
 Debate featuring all five general election candidates, hosted by WCSH-TV and Maine State Chamber of Commerce, Part 1
 Debate featuring all five general election candidates, hosted by WCSH-TV and Maine State Chamber of Commerce, Part 2
 Debate featuring four of the five general election candidates (LePage chose not to participate), hosted by MPBN and Bates College
 Debate featuring all five general election candidates, hosted by WGME-TV, WGAN-AM, and MaineToday Media, Part 1
 Debate featuring all five general election candidates, hosted by WGME-TV, WGAN-AM, and MaineToday Media, Part 2

Candidate interviews
Interview with Democratic candidate Donna Dion
Interview with Republican candidate Les Otten
Interview with Democratic candidate Rosa Scarcelli
Interview with Republican candidate Paul LePage
Interview with Democratic candidate Libby Mitchell
Interview with Independent Alex Hammer
Interview with Republican candidate Paul LePage
Interview with Democratic candidate Libby Mitchell
Interview with Republican candidate Bruce Poliquin
Interview with Democratic candidate Steven Rowe
Interview with Green candidate Lynne Williams
Interview with Independent candidate Shawn Moody

Gubernatorial
2010
2010 United States gubernatorial elections